Han Chan-hee (born 17 March 1997) is a South Korean football midfielder who plays for Gimcheon Sangmu and the South Korea national under-23 football team.

Club career 
Han joined Jeonnam Dragons in 2016 and made his league debut against Seongnam FC on 13 April 2016.

Han joined FC Seoul in January 2020.

International career 
He has been a member of the South Korea national U-20 team since 2014.

Career statistics

Club

References

External links 
 
 kfa.or.kr 
 

1997 births
Living people
People from Suncheon
Association football midfielders
South Korean footballers
Jeonnam Dragons players
FC Seoul players
K League 1 players
K League 2 players
South Korea under-20 international footballers
South Korea under-23 international footballers